Steorts is a surname. Notable people with the surname include:

 Jason Lee Steorts, American journalist, writer, and editor
 Ken Steorts, American guitarist